Cha: An Asian Literary Journal is the first online English literary journal based in Hong Kong.

The journal publishes poetry, fiction, creative nonfiction, book reviews, and photography and art from and about Asia. Although Cha focuses on Asia-related creative works and works by Asian writers and artists, it also publishes works by writers and artists from around the world.

Other former contributors to the journal include, among others, Ai Weiwei, Louie Crew, Duo Duo, Eleanor Goodman, Ma. Luisa Aguilar Igloria, Alan Jefferies, Sushma Joshi, Christopher Kelen, Shirley Lim, Lyn Lifshin, Alvin Pang, Todd Swift, Amy Uyematsu, Eliot Weinberger, Alison Wong, Cyril Wong, Bryan Thao Worra, Xu Xi and Ouyang Yu.

Cha was named Best New Online Magazine in 2008 and Best Online Magazine in 2011 by storySouth's Million Writers Award and was named The Gatekeeper's Site of the Week on Meet at the Gate, the website of Scottish publisher Canongate Books. Work from Cha was chosen for inclusion in the Best of the Web and Best of the Net anthologies in 2009. The journal also features a critique piece, "A Cup of Fine Tea," in which previously published works are discussed.

See also
List of literary magazines

References

"HK magazine to showcase China's English literature scene", China Daily (November 2010)
"Virtual Bookshelf", The Hindu (September 2010)
"Cha - A Cup Overflowing", South China Morning Post (April 2010)
"A Conversation with Tammy Ho Lai-Ming", Lantern Review (February 2010)
"Love for Literature", Time Out Hong Kong feature article on Cha (October 2009)
Cha guest editor Royston Tester (Issue #8, August 2009) interviewed by Beijing's City Weekend on the experience of guest-editing the journal. (14 September 2009)
"Cha Give Online Works Second Life", NewPages blog article. (13 July 2009)
[http://www.duotrope.com/market_2782.aspx Cha'''s information] at Duotrope
[http://www.pw.org/content/cha_asian_literary_journal_0 Cha's information] at Poets & Writers.
"Special Cha Edition" at Asia and Pacific Writers' Network.
Article in "U.S./China media brief" (website of UCLA Asian American Studies Centre) mentions Cha: "In Hong Kong, besides traditional university-based journals, new internet-based journals including Cha'' have embraced a more pan-Asian perspective and have included Chinese American writers as well." (August 2008)

External links
Cha Official Site

2007 establishments in Hong Kong
Magazines published in Hong Kong
Magazines established in 2007
Online literary magazines